NADH dehydrogenase [ubiquinone] iron-sulfur protein 4, mitochondrial (NDUFS4) also known as NADH-ubiquinone oxidoreductase 18 kDa subunit is an enzyme that in humans is encoded by the NDUFS4 gene. This gene encodes a nuclear-encoded accessory subunit of the mitochondrial membrane respiratory chain NADH dehydrogenase (complex I, or NADH:ubiquinone oxidoreductase). Complex I removes electrons from NADH and passes them to the electron acceptor ubiquinone. Mutations in this gene can cause mitochondrial complex I deficiencies such as Leigh syndrome.

Structure 

NDUFS4 is located on the q arm of chromosome 5 in position 11.2 and has 8 exons. The NDUFS4 gene produces a 20.1 kDa protein composed of 175 amino acids. NDUFS4, the protein encoded by this gene, is a member of the complex I NDUFS4 subunit family. It is a peripheral membrane protein located on the matrix side of the inner mitochondrial membrane. NDUFS4 is a component of the iron-sulfur (IP) fragment of the enzyme and contains a transit peptide domain, 4 turns, 6 beta strands, and 4 alpha helixes. Alternative splicing results in multiple transcript variants.

Function 

Complex I, or NADH:ubiquinone oxidoreductase, the first multisubunit enzyme complex of the mitochondrial respiratory chain, plays a vital role in cellular ATP production, the primary source of energy for many crucial processes in living cells. It removes electrons from NADH and passes them by a series of different protein-coupled redox centers to the electron acceptor ubiquinone. In well-coupled mitochondria, the electron flux leads to ATP generation via the building of a proton gradient across the inner membrane. Complex I is composed of at least 41 subunits, of which 7 are encoded by the mitochondrial genome (ND1-6, ND4L) and the remainder by nuclear genes.

Clinical significance 

Mutations in the NDUFS4 gene are associated with Mitochondrial Complex I Deficiency, which is autosomal recessive. This deficiency is the most common enzymatic defect of the oxidative phosphorylation disorders. Mitochondrial complex I deficiency shows extreme genetic heterogeneity and can be caused by mutation in nuclear-encoded genes or in mitochondrial-encoded genes. There are no obvious genotype–phenotype correlations, and inference of the underlying basis from the clinical or biochemical presentation is difficult, if not impossible. However, the majority of cases are caused by mutations in nuclear-encoded genes. It causes a wide range of clinical disorders, ranging from lethal neonatal disease to adult-onset neurodegenerative disorders. Phenotypes include macrocephaly with progressive leukodystrophy, nonspecific encephalopathy, hypertrophic cardiomyopathy, myopathy, liver disease, Leigh syndrome, Leber hereditary optic neuropathy, and some forms of Parkinson disease. Complex I deficiency with autosomal recessive inheritance results from mutation in nuclear-encoded subunit genes, including NDUFV1, NDUFV2, NDUFS1, NDUFS2, NDUFS3, NDUFS6, NDUFS7, NDUFS8, NDUFA2, NDUFA11, NDUFAF3, NDUFAF10, NDUFB3, NDUFB9, ACAD9, FOXRED1, and MTFMT.

Interactions 

NDUFS4 has been shown to have 58 binary protein-protein interactions including 57 co-complex interactions. NDUFS4 appears to interact with UBE2G2.

References

Further reading 

 
 
 
 
 
 
 
 
 
 
 
 
 
 
 
 

Human proteins